Teague McElroy (born 4 March 1997 in New Zealand) is a New Zealand rugby union player who plays for North Harbour in the National Provincial Championship. His playing position is prop.

Reference list

External links
itsrugby.co.uk profile

1997 births
New Zealand rugby union players
Living people
Rugby union props
North Harbour rugby union players